Joachim Ralph Posener, (born 17 January 1964 in Lidingö) is a Swedish financier and author.  Posener is a lawyer by educated who was active in the Swedish finance trade from the late 1980s to the end of the 1990s. He became publicly known in November 1997 after having been accused by the media as being the mastermind behind Lord Moynes acquisition of the Swedish publicly traded company Trustor AB. The company acquisition, which later become known as the Trustor affair eventually ended with one of Lord Moynes "Team" members, Thomas Jisander, being sent to a prison term. When Swedish police acted against Lord Moyne and his "team" in October 1997  Posener happened to be abroad, and he chose then according to his own statements to not return to Sweden. This became very well publicized in Swedish media and also led to  Posener being hand down an international arrest warrant. According to his own statements he was at first for some time in Spain, and later he is supposed to have lived in Argentina. In spite of the International Arrest Warrant  Posener was never found by the police and the crimes the police had suspected him of were no longer actionable against Mr Posener due to the Swedish law on statute of limitations. No one of Lord Moynes "team" could be accused in any court of law with regard to the Trustor Affair after the 20 June 2007.

Joachim Posener has not been found guilty of any crime in connection with the Trustor Affair and the police have no longer any interest in him as of 2009. With regard to any economic relationship between Posener and Trustor AB the two parties settled out of court in 2007, a settlement that among other things had  Posener pay 1.5 million SEK to Trustor AB.

Two and a half years later, in December 2009, Swedish police and State prosecutor Bernt Berger met with Joachim Posener and Posener's Swedish attorney  Leif Gustafson, at Posener's own request at the Swedish embassy in Belgium. The meeting came to be because  Posener wished to be interrogated by police so the last criminal charges against him could be written off. The question was if Posener had the right to under the existing legal circumstances in which he found himself in 2004 published the book Internationellt Efterlyst – Mitt liv efter Trustor. And also for appearing in a Swedish TV-interview with the show 45 Minuter hosted by Renée Nyberg and broadcast on TV3 to talk about his case. Shortly after  the meeting in Brussels Bernt Berger wrote off all remaining suspicions against Posener and therefore, since 2009, there exist no remaining suspicions of wrongdoing by Joachim Posener.

References

Living people
1964 births
Swedish businesspeople